"Moments of Pleasure" is a song written and recorded by British musician Kate Bush, released in November 1993 as the third single from Bush's seventh studio album, The Red Shoes (1993). The song peaked at number 26 on the UK Singles Chart.

Composition
In this song, Bush remembers friends and family who have died, including guitarist Alan Murphy, film director Michael Powell, dancer Gary Hurst, lighting engineer Bill Duffield, and others. Composer and musician Michael Kamen arranged and conducted the orchestra, expanding on Bush's original piano accompaniment. Bush wrote the chorus "to those we love, to those who will survive" for her mother, who was sick at the time of recording. She died a short time later. The Director's Cut version features the chorus without lyrics.

Critical reception
In his review of the song, Ben Thompson from The Independent commented, "A smile and a tear from the Welling siren." Alan Jones from Music Week gave it four out of five and named it Pick of the Week, writing, "Beautiful and traditional Bush fare with expansive orchestrations, poignant vocals and off-her-trolley lyrics. As subtle as "Rubberband Girl" was direct, and probably as big a hit."

B-sides
Prior to its inclusion in The Other Side 2, part of the 2018 Remastered collection, B-side "Show a Little Devotion" was one of Bush's more elusive songs, only appearing on a small handful of CD singles that were released just prior to Christmas 1993. The version of "December Will Be Magic Again" that appears on this release is slightly different from all the other mixes previously released. It is essentially the same as the original single mix, but it is brighter, and the percussion instruments are different. The CD release also includes "Experiment IV" which was released in 1986. The 12-inch and cassette releases contain an instrumental version of "Moments of Pleasure", which has yet to be released on CD, and a third track entitled "Home for Christmas", which was also released on the US "Rubberband Girl", CD single. This was the first and only Kate Bush single (that received a physical release) not to be issued on 7-inch vinyl in the United Kingdom.

Track listings
12-inch

CD

Collectors CD Box Set (includes four colour prints)

Cassette

Personnel
 Kate Bush – vocals, piano
 Michael Kamen – orchestral arrangements

Charts

References

Kate Bush songs
1993 singles
1993 songs
EMI Records singles
Commemoration songs
Songs written by Kate Bush